Daniel James Curtin (14 February 1898 – 4 December 1980) was an Australian politician. Born in Sydney, he was educated at a Catholic primary school before becoming a boilermaker and organiser of the Boilermakers' Society. In 1949, he was preselected by the Australian Labor Party to contest the safe Labor seat of Watson, displacing the sitting member, Max Falstein, who contested the seat as an independent. Curtin won the seat, which he held until 1955, when he transferred to the seat of Kingsford-Smith. He held Kingsford-Smith until 1969, when he retired from politics. Curtin provided an opportunity for several Indigenous Australian women to become involved in politics.

References

1898 births
1980 deaths
Australian Labor Party members of the Parliament of Australia
Australian boilermakers
Members of the Australian House of Representatives for Kingsford Smith
Members of the Australian House of Representatives for Watson
20th-century Australian politicians